Kim Gi-ung (born 20 November 1961) is a South Korean weightlifter. He competed in the men's lightweight event at the 1988 Summer Olympics.

References

1961 births
Living people
South Korean male weightlifters
Olympic weightlifters of South Korea
Weightlifters at the 1988 Summer Olympics
Place of birth missing (living people)
Asian Games medalists in weightlifting
Weightlifters at the 1986 Asian Games
Asian Games bronze medalists for South Korea
Medalists at the 1986 Asian Games
20th-century South Korean people
21st-century South Korean people